Metal Hammer is a heavy metal music magazine and website founded in 1983, published in the United Kingdom by Future, with other language editions available in numerous other countries. Metal Hammer features news, reviews and long-form articles covering both major and underground bands in heavy metal, as well as covering rock, punk, grunge and other alternative music genres.

Publication history
Wilfried F. Rimensberger conceived Metal Hammer in 1983, taking the idea of a rock magazine publishing in different languages to Jürgen Wigginghaus, publisher of the German magazine MusikSzene, where Rimensberger was chief editor. Wigginghaus helped launch the German edition of Metal Hammer soon after, while Rimensberger launched the flagship, English language version from London in November 1986, installing Harry Doherty, formerly of Melody Maker, as editor. The magazine would grow to be published in 11 different languages around the world, including local language editions in Israel, Japan, Serbia, Spain, The Netherlands, Italy, Poland, Hungary and France, also becoming the first Western youth publication in the Soviet Union.

Metal Hammer UK changed owners several times between the early 90s and late 2010s. It was bought by Dennis Publishing in 1994, where it remained for six years before being sold to Future in 2000. In 2013, start-up publisher TeamRock bought the magazine alongside sister titles Classic Rock and Prog, before Future bought all three brands back following the collapse of TeamRock in December 2016.

In 2018, Future launched Louder, a new 'parent brand' for Metal Hammer, Classic Rock and Prog that would house all three magazines' respective websites.

Metal Hammer Germany was sold to Axel Springer SE in 1999.

Brand extensions

Metal Hammer Golden Gods Awards 

The Golden Gods Awards were established in 2003 by then-editor Chris Ingham, designed to commemorate the biggest and most exciting names in heavy metal. The annual ceremony, featuring band performances in front of a live crowd, took place from 2003-2018. Over the course of 15 years, the likes of Ozzy Osbourne, Iron Maiden, Motörhead, Slipknot, Tony Iommi, Brian May, Dave Mustaine, Rob Zombie, Bill Bailey, Chris Jericho and more either performed or appeared at the awards.

Podcasts and radio shows 
The Metal Hammer Podcast was launched in 2009, originally presented by Metal Hammer staff members James Gill and Terry Bezer and covering weekly news and events from the world of metal, as well as reviews of new albums from prominent artists. It'd go on to be presented by Merlin Alderslade, Stephen Hill and Amit Sharma, before being put on hold in 2013 as Metal Hammer launched The Metal Hammer Radio Show on TeamRock's newly founded digital radio station. The radio show continued until 2018, when it was taken off air.

In 2016, Metal Hammer launched a limited ...In Residence series in partnership with Spotify, presented by Alderslade, Luke Morton and then-Metal Hammer editor-in-chief, Alexander Milas. The show produced six episodes featuring exclusive interviews with major metal artists, including Iron Maiden and Bring Me The Horizon.

After a five-year hiatus, The Metal Hammer Podcast returned in 2018, hosted by Alderslade, Morton and Eleanor Goodman, staying on air for four more years before going back on hiatus in 2022.

Magazines in other territories 
There remain Greek and Italian Metal Hammer publications, while Portuguese and Japanese editions of the publication were launched in 2019 and 2020 respectively.

In Germany, Metal Hammer is still published by Axel Springer SE.

See also
Classic Rock
Prog
Malcolm Dome
Joel McIver

References

External links

1983 establishments in the United Kingdom
Axel Springer SE
British heavy metal music
Monthly magazines published in the United Kingdom
Music magazines published in the United Kingdom
Heavy metal publications
Magazines established in 1983
Magazines published in London